Mazari an-Nubani is a Palestinian town in the Ramallah and al-Bireh Governorate, located 25 kilometers North of Ramallah in the northern West Bank. According to the Palestinian Central Bureau of Statistics (PCBS), the town had a population of approximately 2,510 inhabitants in mid-year 2006.

History 
Mazari al-Nubani was by  earlier scholars (Röhricht, Prawer and Benvenisti)  identified with the Crusader village called Mezera, but  newer  scholars (Finkelstein et al.) disputes this.

Ottoman era 
In 1596 the village, under the name of Mazra'at al-'Abbas, appeared  in the Ottoman tax registers as being in the Nahiya of Quds of the Liwa of Quds.  It had a population of 60  households and 21 bachelors, all Muslim. Taxes were paid  on wheat, barley, olive trees, vineyards and fruit trees, goats and/or beehives; a total of 6,910  akçe. 1/3 of the revenue went to a Waqf.

In 1838 el-Mezari'a was noted as a Muslim village, part of the Beni Zeid area, located north of Jerusalem.

When Guérin passed by the village in 1870,  he estimated it had  a population of about 600.  An Ottoman village list from about the same year  showed Mazari with a population of 560, in 163 houses,  though the population count included men only. It was also noted it was located east of Qarawat Bani Zeid.

In 1882, the  PEF's Survey of Western Palestine  described the village, then called Mezrah, as being of moderate size, on high ground.

British Mandate era 
In the 1922 census of Palestine conducted  by the British Mandate authorities,  Mazarie' al-Nubani had a population of 611 Muslims,   increasing in the 1931 census to 864 Muslims, in  193  houses.

The 1945 statistics found  1,090 Muslim inhabitants  with a total of 9,631 dunam of land.  Of  this,  7,399  were used for   plantations and irrigable land, 445  for cereals, while 59 dunams were classified as built-up areas.

Jordanian era 
In the wake of the 1948 Arab–Israeli War, and after the 1949 Armistice Agreements, Mazari Nubani came under Jordanian rule.

In 1961, the population of Mazari al-Nubani was 1,358.

Post 1967 
Since the Six-Day War in 1967, Mazari al-Nuban has been under  Israeli occupation.

According to the Palestinian Central Bureau of Statistics (PCBS), the town had a population of approximately 2,510 inhabitants in mid-year 2006.

Footnotes

Bibliography

External links
 Welcome To Mazari' al-Nubani
Survey of Western Palestine, Map 14:  IAA, Wikimedia commons 

Villages in the West Bank
Ramallah and al-Bireh Governorate